The Sergeant Major of the Army (SMA) is a unique non-commissioned rank and position of office in the United States Army. The holder of this rank and position is the most senior enlisted soldier in the Army, unless an enlisted soldier is serving as the Senior Enlisted Advisor to the Chairman. The SMA is appointed to serve as a spokesman to address the issues of enlisted soldiers to all officers, from warrant officers and lieutenants to the Army's highest positions. As such, they are the senior enlisted advisor to the Chief of Staff of the Army. The exact duties vary depending on the chief of staff, though much of the SMA's time is spent traveling throughout the Army, observing training and talking with soldiers and their families.

Kenneth O. Preston held the rank from 15 January 2004 through 28 February 2011, the only incumbent to serve longer than five years. SMA Michael A. Grinston has held the office since 9 August 2019.

While the SMA is a non-commissioned officer, protocol places the SMA higher than all lieutenant generals (except for the Director of the Army Staff) and equivalent to a general for formal courtesies in addition to seating, billeting, transportation, and parking.

History
The rank and position were based on those of the Sergeant Major of the Marine Corps (established in its current incarnation on 23 May 1957). The Chief of Staff of the Army created the position in 1966 after asking leaders of the major commands for a personal recommendation.  He asked that it not be considered a near-retirement type assignment.  He listed seven duties and functions he expected the Sergeant Major to perform, including service as a personal adviser and assistant on matters pertaining to enlisted soldiers.  From 4,700 proposed candidates, 21 nominees were selected. Finally chosen was the only one then serving in Vietnam, Sergeant Major William O. Wooldridge of the 1st Infantry Division.
 
The other services later followed, creating the positions of Master Chief Petty Officer of the Navy and Chief Master Sergeant of the Air Force in 1967, Master Chief Petty Officer of the Coast Guard in 1969, Senior Enlisted Advisor to the Chairman in 2005, and Chief Master Sergeant of the Space Force in 2020. These seven positions are collectively referred to as "senior enlisted advisors" ("SEAs").

Insignia

The sergeant major of the Army, like counterparts in the other branches, wears a unique rank insignia, including a unique collar insignia ("brass").
 
The collar insignia of the SMA is the shield portion of the collar insignia of an aide-de-camp to the Army Chief of Staff (less the surmounting eagle), placed upon an enlisted collar disk of gold color, one inch in diameter.  The insignia worn by SMA Wooldridge was hand-soldered by Colonel Jasper J. Wilson from the cannibalized insignia and enlisted collar brass of an  aide. The insignia was approved on 4 July 1966.  Originally, the SMA would wear the device on each collar, but he now wears the standard "U.S." disk on his right collar as do all enlisted soldiers.  This insignia is also worn in place of a unit insignia on the SMA's beret, garrison cap, and pull-over sweater.  The collar insignia of the senior enlisted advisor to the chairman ("SEAC") of the JCS, approved 2 February 2006, is based directly upon that of the SMA, and features the shield of an aide de camp to the chairman of the joint chiefs of staff (without the surmounting eagle), on a gold-colored disk.

The SMA's cap device, worn on the front of the blue service cap (and, formerly, the white service cap; and, until 2011 the green service cap) is a gold-colored rendering of the United States' coat of arms, surrounded by a wreath.  The cap device for all other U.S. Army enlisted soldiers is a gold-colored rendering of the United States' coat of arms on a gold-colored disk (males) or surrounded by a gold colored ring (females).  The chief master sergeant of the Air Force has the same cap device as the SMA, but in silver-colored metal.

Positional color

The Sergeant Major of the Army, Chief Master Sergeant of the Air Force, Chief Master Sergeant of the Space Force, and the Senior Enlisted Advisor to the Chairman  are the only members of the United States armed forces below the rank of brigadier general/rear admiral, lower half to be authorized a positional color (flag).  First considered in 1992, the SMA's color has been authorized since 22 March 1999.  It is based on the design of his collar insignia and the positional flag of the Chief of Staff, Army.  Like the SEAC's collar brass, the SEAC's positional color was patterned after the SMA's color.

List of Sergeants Major of the Army

Timeline

See also

 Senior Enlisted Advisor to the Chairman of the Joint Chiefs of Staff
 Sergeant Major of the Marine Corps
 Master Chief Petty Officer of the Navy
 Chief Master Sergeant of the Air Force
 Chief Master Sergeant of the Space Force
 Master Chief Petty Officer of the Coast Guard
 Senior Enlisted Advisor for the National Guard Bureau
 Army Staff Senior Warrant Officer

References

External links

Military ranks of the United States Army
United States military enlisted ranks
Senior Enlisted Advisor